Antonia of Lorraine (1568–1610) was a French aristocrat. The daughter of duke Charles III of Lorraine, and Claude of Valois, she was styled as the Duchess of Jülich-Kleve-Berg.

She was married to John William, Duke of Jülich-Cleves-Berg. They did not have children.

References

1568 births
1610 deaths